Ryuma Hirota (born 13 August 1976) is a Japanese equestrian. He competed in two events at the 2000 Summer Olympics.

References

1976 births
Living people
Japanese male equestrians
Olympic equestrians of Japan
Equestrians at the 2000 Summer Olympics
Place of birth missing (living people)
Equestrians at the 2006 Asian Games
Asian Games competitors for Japan